The Azerbaijani Chess Championship is usually held in Baku, Azerbaijan. It is organised by the Azerbaijan Chess Federation (ACF). The first championship was played in 1934, when Azerbaijan was a part of the Transcaucasian Socialist Federative Soviet Republic. Championships were held sporadically in the Azerbaijan Soviet Socialist Republic until 1945, when they became contested every year; this has continued today in independent Azerbaijan.

Winners

References

External links 
 Official web site of Azerbaijan Chess Federation (ACF) 
 Azerbaijan Chess Federation 

Chess national championships
Women's chess national championships
Championship